Gabriel Lemoine (born 26 March 2001) is a Belgian professional footballer who plays as a forward for Belgian National Division 1 club RAAL La Louvière.

Club career
Lemoine is a former youth academy player of Club Brugge. In August 2019, he joined French club Bordeaux on a three-year deal. After failing to break into the club's first team squad, he joined Lommel on a short-term loan deal in February 2021, with option to buy. However, he left the club after loan period without making any appearances.

On 3 August 2021, Austrian club TSV Hartberg announced the signing of Lemoine on a two-year deal. He made his professional debut four days later on 7 August in a 4–3 league defeat against Austria Klagenfurt.

Lemoine returned to his hometown of La Louvière on 5 July 2022, signing with recently promoted Belgian National Division 1 club RAAL La Louvière.

International career
Lemoine is a former Belgian youth international. He was part of Belgian squad which reached semi-finals of 2018 UEFA European Under-17 Championship.

Personal life
Born in Belgium, Lemoine is of Brazilian descent. His brother Laurent Lemoine is also a professional footballer.

Career statistics

Club

References

External links
 
 National team profile at acff.be

2001 births
Living people
Belgian people of Brazilian descent
Association football forwards
Belgian footballers
Belgium youth international footballers
Championnat National 3 players
Austrian Football Bundesliga players
TSV Hartberg players
RAAL La Louvière players
Belgian expatriate footballers
Belgian expatriate sportspeople in France
Belgian expatriate sportspeople in Austria
Expatriate footballers in France
Expatriate footballers in Austria
People from La Louvière
Footballers from Hainaut (province)